Stephen Packard (born 1943) is an American conservationist, author, and ecological restoration practitioner active in the Chicago area.

Packard began his career in restoration ecology in 1977 as a volunteer with the "North Branch Prairie Project" in Cook County, Illinois. The project is now known as the North Branch Restoration Project. In 1978, he became a field representative for the Illinois chapter of The Nature Conservancy (TNC-Illinois). From 1983-1999, he was the Director of Science and Stewardship for TNC-Illinois. Packard founded the Audubon Chicago Region chapter in 1999 and worked for this organization until 2014. The chapter has since expanded to encompass the Great Lakes region and is now known as Audubon Great Lakes. Between 2008 and 2013 he taught "Science and Policy of Ecological Conservation" at Northwestern University.

Stephen Packard is a founding member/contributor to Society for Ecological Restoration, TNC's Volunteer Stewardship Network, Chicago Wilderness and its "Mighty Acorns" program, Friends of the Forest Preserves, and the Wild Things conference. He sits on the national advisory board for Wild Ones.

He serves as a volunteer land steward for the Forest Preserves of Cook County's Somme Prairie Grove.

Publications

References

External links
 Packard's blog: "Strategies for Stewards: from woods to prairies"
 A TEDx Talk by Packard: "Nature is Counting on Us"
 North Branch Restoration Project

1943 births
Living people
American conservationists
American ecologists
American naturalists
American non-fiction environmental writers
Harvard University alumni